Dul Kabud-e Khvoshadul (also Romanized as Dūl Kabūd-e Khvoshādūl) is a village in Shuhan Rural District, in the Central District of Malekshahi County, Ilam Province, Iran. At the 2006 census, its population was 128, in 27 families. The village is populated by Lurs.

References 

Populated places in Malekshahi County
Luri settlements in Ilam Province